The 52nd annual Berlin International Film Festival was held from February 6 to 17, 2002. The festival opened with Heaven by Tom Tykwer. New print of Charlie Chaplin's 1940 American satirical dramedy film The Great Dictator was the closing film of the festival. The Golden Bear was awarded to British–Irish film Bloody Sunday directed by Paul Greengrass and Japanese Animated film Spirited Away directed by Hayao Miyazaki.

The retrospective dedicated to European films from the 1960s titled European 60s was shown at the festival. Dieter Kosslick became the director of the festival, taking over from Moritz de Hadeln.

Jury

The following people were announced as being on the jury for the festival:
 Mira Nair, director and screenwriter (India) - Jury President
 Nicoletta Braschi, actress (Italy)
 Peter Cowie, historian and writer (United Kingdom)
 Renata Litvinova, actress, director and screenwriter (Russia)
 Lucrecia Martel, director and screenwriter (Argentina)
 Claudie Ossard, producer (France)
 Raoul Peck, director (Haiti)
 Declan Quinn, director of photography (United States)
 Oskar Roehler, director, screenwriter and journalist (Germany)
 Kenneth Turan, professor and film critic (United States)

Films in competition
The following films were in competition for the Golden Bear and Silver Bear awards:

Key
{| class="wikitable" width="550" colspan="1"
| style="background:#FFDEAD;" align="center"| †
|Winner of the main award for best film in its section
|-
| colspan="2"| The opening and closing films are screened during the opening and closing ceremonies respectively.
|}

Retrospective

The following films were shown in the retrospective:

Awards

The following prizes were awarded by the Jury:
 Golden Bear: Bloody Sunday by Paul Greengrass and Spirited Away by Hayao Miyazaki
 Silver Bear – Special Jury Prize: Grill Point by Andreas Dresen
 Silver Bear for Best Director: Otar Iosseliani for Monday Morning
 Silver Bear for Best Actress: Halle Berry for Monster's Ball
 Silver Bear for Best Actor: Jacques Gamblin for Safe Conduct
 Silver Bear for an outstanding artistic contribution: ensemble of actresses for 8 Women
 Silver Bear for best film music: Antoine Duhamel for Safe Conduct
 Alfred Bauer Prize: Baader by Christopher Roth
 Blue Angel Award: Minor Mishaps by Annette K. Olesen
 Honorary Golden Bear:
Claudia Cardinale
Robert Altman
 Berlinale Camera:
Costa-Gavras
Volker Hassemer
Horst Wendlandt
FIPRESCI Award
Monday Morning by Otar Iosseliani

References

External links
Berlin International Film Festival:2002 at Internet Movie Database
 52nd Berlin International Film Festival 2002

52
2002 film festivals
2002 festivals in Europe
2002 in Berlin
2002 in German cinema